Jacqueline Lenita Clark-Chisholm (née Cullum; December 29, 1948), known professionally as Jacky Clark-Chisholm, is an American Grammy Award-winning gospel singer, songwriter, and licensed practical nurse who is best known as the eldest member of the American gospel singing group The Clark Sisters.

Biography

Early life and career
Chisholm was born December 29, 1948, in Detroit Michigan, the second child of legendary gospel music innovator Dr. Mattie Moss-Clark and her husband Leo Henry Cullum, Sr. When Chisholm was young, her parents divorced and her mother married Elbert Clark (d. 2001). This union produced her four younger sisters; Denise, Elbernita, Dorinda, and Karen, the group that would one day become The Clark Sisters. She attended Mumford High School in Detroit, Michigan, graduating in 1967. Their mother, who served as the Church of God in Christ's International Minister of Music and taught them to sing together in their father's church, created the gospel singing group The Clark Sisters with Chisholm and her sisters, and they released their first album, "Jesus Has A Lot to Give" in 1973. The group flourished and became known for their live performances and classic songs, including "Is My Living in Vain" and their biggest hit, "You Brought the Sunshine".

Solo career
On March 29, 2005, Chisholm released her first solo album, Expectancy, on the Entheos Records label. On this album she teamed up with songwriter/producer Carnell Murrell, Autun Foster, and Doreonne Stramler. Recorded live at the Cathedral Center in Detroit, the album's background vocals were supplied by a special assembly of vocalists, which included two of her children, Angel and Aaron Chisholm, as well as Lorenzo Clark, her sister Denise Clark Bradford's son. The choir was directed by Bryon Stanfield. Her vision for the album is simply meant to “minister to the heart and soul, to restore the people of God who’ve been hurt working in the church.”  Her signature vocals can be heard on “Oil of God,” “We Are Overcomers” featuring her sister Elbernita "Twinkie" Clark, and the urban Gospel tune “My Soul Says Yes.” The album also features a duet with Jacky and Ron Winans and a special appearance by the Clark Sisters together on “Blessing Me.”   On March 25, 2014, Jacky released a single  "My Season", accompanied with the song "On My Mind". This was the first release of new material since her 2005 solo debut. In 2020, she released a new single, “Feel Good” featuring Mary J. Blige and rapper Tia P.

Stage performer
As a performer, Chisholm has often taken major roles in nationally touring gospel stage plays such as Lawd Have Mercy, Mama Don’t, Can A Woman Make A Man Lose His Mind, and The Man of Her Dreams.

Chisholm was portrayed by Broadway theatre actress Angela Birchett in the Lifetime TV biopic The Clark Sisters: First Ladies of Gospel, released April 11, 2020.

Musical influence
While her sibling counterparts are known for their impassioned vocals, Chisholm in contrast is known as the "sweet-voiced" sister. "I feel there is a need for more music that allows the listener to enter into praise and worship for the Lord," she asserts. "People have a need to meditate upon their own personal relationship with God, and I think that the kind of music I wish to perform will give them the space to reflect on God from their own points of view."

Within the Clark Sisters, Chisholm sings the alto and tenor lines; usually alto when all four are singing or Dorinda is leading, or tenor when Twinkie leads or does not sing. In addition to the songs she leads on such as Wonderful Counselor and I've Got An Angel, her unique vocal style can be clearly heard on their Miracle album, which was recorded during the period when Twinkie was not with the group. Due to her role in blending their harmonies, her sister Karen has referred to her as the "Engine that keeps the Clark Sisters going."

Other ventures
Chisholm is an evangelist at her home church, Greater Emmanuel Institutional Church of God In Christ in Detroit, Michigan where Presiding Bishop of the Church of God In Christ, the Most Reverend, Bishop J. Drew Sheard is Pastor, and is also the husband of her youngest sister, Karen. Chisholm served as Director of the Youth Choir for the Church of God in Christ, Inc. National Music Department. In 2018, she was appointed by Presiding Bishop Emeritus, Charles E. Blake as the Supervisor of Women for the 2nd Ecclesiastical Dominican Republic Jurisdiction.

In addition to singing with The Clark Sisters, Chisholm soon emerged as a formidable leader in business, becoming spokesperson for the group, managing promotion, correspondence, public relations, interviews, and the like, all while earning a nursing degree.  She is a Licensed Practical Nurse and certified wound care associate. Along with her mother and sister Twinkie, Chisholm helped with the establishment of the Dr. Mattie Moss Clark Conservatory of Music in Detroit, Michigan in 1979. Trusted as administrator of the school, she developed a curriculum and organized workshops that trained hundreds of students over the years.

Chisholm is also a spokesperson for the American Diabetes Association, and has done radio and television commercials for New York Life Insurance. Moreover, her stature provided her a platform as a motivational speaker for fundraisers such as H.O.P.E. South Africa in Johannesburg, South Africa. Professionally, Chisholm has been an instructor for the American Red Cross for 10 years. She earned a bachelor's degree in Family Life Education and Psychology and plans to open a counseling center for battered women and children.

Personal life
Chisholm was married to Glynn Chisholm from May 5, 1973, until his death on November 28, 2019. Together, they had three children: Aaron, Michael, and Angelyn (Angel), and three grandchildren. Angel currently serves as The Clark Sisters' musical director and backup singer.

Discography

Albums

Extended plays

Singles

as lead artist

Awards

BET Awards

The BET Awards are awarded annually by the Black Entertainment Television network. Jacky Clark Chisholm has received 2 nominations.

Dove Awards

The Dove Awards are awarded annually by the Gospel Music Association. Jacky Clark Chisholm has won 2 awards from 8 nominations.

Grammy Awards

The Grammy Awards are awarded annually by the National Academy of Recording Arts and Sciences. Jacky Clark Chisholm has won 2 awards from 7 nominations.

NAACP Image Awards

The NAACP Image Awards are awarded annually by the National Association for the Advancement of Colored People (NAACP). Jacky Clark Chisholm has won 2 awards from 4 nominations.

Soul Train Awards
The Soul Train Music Awards are awarded annually. Jacky Clark Chisholm has received 3 nominations.

Stellar Awards
The Stellar Awards are awarded annually by SAGMA. Jacky Clark Chisholm has received 8 awards and 1 honorary award.

References

External links
 

American gospel singers
Singers from Detroit
Living people
21st-century African-American women singers
20th-century African-American women singers
American Pentecostals
Members of the Church of God in Christ
1948 births
African-American Christians